Karen Dokka (born 25 January 1947 in Vancouver) is a Canadian former alpine skier who competed in the 1964 Winter Olympics and in the 1968 Winter Olympics.

References

1947 births
Living people
Skiers from Vancouver
Canadian female alpine skiers
Olympic alpine skiers of Canada
Alpine skiers at the 1964 Winter Olympics
Alpine skiers at the 1968 Winter Olympics